Max Mayer was a Swiss footballer who played as midfielder.

Career 
Born in Switzerland, he moved to Italy to play for Genoa. For the Ligurian club, he played three seasons: 1905, 1906 and 1909–10. His debut for the club on 5 February 1905, in a 0–0 draw against Andrea Doria. In his first season with Genoa, he obtained the second place in the national group, and the third place the following season.

After three seasons of inactivity, he returned to Genoa in the 1909–10 season, obtaining the fourth place in the final group stage round.

After the experience in Liguria, he returned to Switzerland where he played for St. Gallen and Basel.

With St. Gallen, he obtained the third place in the Eastern Group of the 1910–11 Swiss Serie A.

The following season, he moved to Basel, with which he obtained the fifth place in the Central Group.

References 

Swiss men's footballers
FC St. Gallen players
FC Basel players
Genoa C.F.C. players
Swiss expatriate footballers
Expatriate footballers in Italy
Association football midfielders